Justin Davies may refer to:
Justin Davies (footballer), Australian rules footballer
Justin Davies (rugby union), New Zealand rugby union player
Justin Davies, candidate in 2007 National Assembly for Wales election
Justin Davies (actor), actor in UK TV series Stella
Justin Davies, character in The Secret Life of Us
Justin Davies, character in Queerspiracy, played by Matthew Shaffer

See also
Justin Davis (disambiguation)